Zeddy may refer to

Zeddy Saileti (born 1969), Zambian football (soccer) player then coach
Zed Al Refai (born 1966), Kuwaiti climber, nicknamed "Zeddy"
Zeddy (mascot),  teddy bear mascot of Zellers, a Canadian chain of department stores

See also
Zeddie (or Z Class or Takapuna), an old New Zealand sailing dinghy